Visa requirements for Angolan citizens are administrative entry restrictions by the authorities of other states placed on citizens of Angola. As of 2 July 2019, Angolan citizens had visa-free or visa on arrival access to 49 countries and territories, ranking the Angolan passport 95th in terms of travel freedom (tied with passports from Egypt, Haiti, Jordan, Laos and Vietnam) according to the Henley Passport Index.

Visa requirements map

Visa requirements

Dependent, Disputed, or Restricted territories
Unrecognized or partially recognized countries

Dependent and autonomous territories

Non-visa restrictions

See also

 Visa policy of Angola
 Angolan passport

References and Notes
References

Notes

Angola
Foreign relations of Angola